Sericostola is a genus of sedge moths described by Edward Meyrick in 1927.

Taxonomy
The genus was included in the Plutellidae by Fletcher in 1929 but was transferred to the Glyphipterigidae by John B. Heppner in 1984.

Species
 Sericostola rhodanopa
 Sericostola semibrunnea

References

External links
 Sericostola at Global Species

Glyphipterigidae